John Gilbert Hay Liddell (17 April 1915 – March 1986) was a Scottish professional footballer who played in the Football League for Brighton & Hove Albion as an inside forward. He began his career with Dunbar United and scored 155 goals in 146 appearances for the club.

References 

English Football League players
Clapton Orient F.C. wartime guest players
Scottish footballers
Association football inside forwards
1915 births
1986 deaths
Footballers from Edinburgh
Dunbar United F.C. players
Airdrieonians F.C. (1878) players
Bolton Wanderers F.C. players
Brighton & Hove Albion F.C. players
Ebbsfleet United F.C. players
Hastings United F.C. (1948) players